A relic, in religion, is the preserved physical remains or personal effects of a saint or venerated person. 

Relic, Relics or The Relic may also refer to:

Film and television
 The Relic (film), a 1997 horror film based on the 1995 novel Relic by Preston and Child
 Relic (2020 film), an Australian horror film
 Relics: Einstein's Brain, a 1994 documentary
 "Relics" (Star Trek: The Next Generation), a TV episode 
 "Relic", an episode of Smallville (season 3)
 "Relic", a fictional character in The Beachcombers

Gaming
 Relic Entertainment, a Canadian video game developer
 Relic Online, a former online gaming system
 Relic (Dungeons & Dragons), a fictional magical item 
 Relic, a collectible item in the video game series Crash Bandicoot
 Relic, an objective in video game Age of Empires II: The Age of Kings
 The Relic (video game), 2011

Literature
 Relic (novel), a 1995 novel by Douglas Preston and Lincoln Child
 The Relic (novel), an 1887 novel by José Maria de Eça de Queirós
 Relic, a 2001 novel by Tom Egeland
 Relic, a 2018 novel by Alan Dean Foster
 Relic, a comic book enemy of Green Lantern

Music
 Relics (album), by Pink Floyd, 1971
 "The Relic", a song by Iced Earth from the 2017 album Incorruptible
 "The Relic", a song by Symphony X from the 1998 album Twilight in Olympus

See also

Relict (disambiguation)
Relix, a magazine that focuses on live and improvisational music
Residue (disambiguation)